Mauro Ezequiel Cerutti (born 29 March 1994) is an Argentine professional footballer who plays as a midfielder for Greek Super League 2 club Panachaiki.

Career
Cerutti began his career with Independiente Rivadavia. A twelve-minute appearance in the Copa Argentina against Almirante Brown in April 2014 saw Cerutti make his bow in senior football, replacing Héctor Cardozo in a defeat at the Estadio San Juan del Bicentenario. He made his debut in Primera B Nacional versus Crucero del Norte in the succeeding June, which lasted just forty-five minutes after he received a red card on the brink of half-time. Sixty total appearances followed across the next five seasons, with the midfielder netting his opening career goals against Juventud Unida and Argentinos Juniors in the process.

Cerutti left Independiente Rivadavia on 31 December 2017 after rejecting a new contract, though was unable to join a new club due to disagreements with his former team. Cerutti, who is of Italian descent, joined second tier side Temperley on a free transfer on 30 June 2018; having trained with them since February. He remained for two seasons, making forty-one appearances in all competitions; he also scored two goals, with both arriving in December 2018 against Deportivo Morón and Independiente Rivadavia respectively. In August 2020, Cerutti moved abroad with Super League Greece 2 team Panachaiki.

Career statistics
.

References

External links

1994 births
Living people
Sportspeople from Mendoza, Argentina
Argentine people of Italian descent
Argentine footballers
Association football midfielders
Argentine expatriate footballers
Expatriate footballers in Greece
Argentine expatriate sportspeople in Greece
Primera Nacional players
Independiente Rivadavia footballers
Club Atlético Temperley footballers
Panachaiki F.C. players